Syllepte lineolata is a moth in the family Crambidae. It was described by Sepp in 1855. It is found in Indonesia (Sumatra).

References

Moths described in 1855
lineolata
Moths of Indonesia